Stephen McKenna may refer to:
 Stephen McKenna (novelist) (1888–1967), English novelist
 Stephen McKenna (footballer) (born 1985), Scottish footballer
 Stephen McKenna (artist) (1939–2017), English visual artist
 Stephen McKenna (boxer) (born 1997), Irish boxer
 Stephen MacKenna (1872–1934), Irish translator of Plotinus
 Stephen MacKenna (actor) (born 1945), English actor
 Steve McKenna, ice hockey player
 Steve McKenna, character in The Mechanic (2011 film)
 Steve McKenna, provided voice over for Office Monkey
 Steve McKenna (golfer) in Lytham Trophy
 Steve McKenna (musician) on Return to Evermore

See also
 McKenna (disambiguation)